Johann "Hans" Joseph Kmoch (July 25, 1894, Vienna – February 13, 1973, New York City) was an Austrian-Dutch-American chess International Master (1950), International Arbiter (1951), and a chess journalist and author, for which he is best known.

Playing career 
Kmoch had most of his best competitive results between 1925 and 1931. He won at Debrecen 1925 with 10/13 over a field which had 12 of the world's top 56 players; chessmetrics.com rates this as a 2696 performance. At Budapest 1926, he shared 3rd-5th places with 9/15 behind winners Ernst Gruenfeld and Mario Monticelli. Kmoch shared 2nd-3rd places at Kecskemet 1927 with 6/9 behind the winner, world chess champion Alexander Alekhine. At Vienna 1928, Kmoch placed 6th with 8/13 as Richard Reti won. Then at the Trebitsch Memorial, Vienna 1928, Kmoch shared 3rd-6th places with 6/10, half a point behind Gruenfeld and Sandor Takacs. At Brno 1928, Kmoch placed 3rd with 6/9, with Reti and Friedrich Saemisch winning. Kmoch won at Ebensee 1930 with 6/7, ahead of Erich Eliskases.

Kmoch represented Austria three times in chess Olympiads. Here are his detailed results, according to olimpbase.org. At London 1927, he played board three and scored 6.5/12 (+4 =5 -3). At Hamburg 1930, he was on board one, and scored 8/14 (+6 =4 -4), as Austria placed fourth. Then at Prague 1931, Kmoch was on board three and scored 9/15 (+4 =10 -1); overall, he scored 23.5/41 (+14 =19 -8), for 57.3 per cent.

His last good tournament result was 2nd at Baarn 1941 with 5.5/7, behind Max Euwe, and he stopped playing competitively after this.

Writing career         
Kmoch had written for the magazine Wiener Schachzeitung from the early 1920s. His Die Kunst der Verteidigung (The Art of Defence) was the first chess book devoted to this subject. In 1930, Kmoch updated the Bilguier openings handbook, and wrote the tournament book for the Carlsbad 1929 event. 

In 1929 and 1934, Kmoch  served as Alexander Alekhine's second in his world championship matches against Efim Bogoljubow. Kmoch and his Jewish wife Trudy lived in the Netherlands from 1932 to 1947. Kmoch also served as Alekhine's second in the 1935 title match against Max Euwe, and he wrote a book on the match. In 1941, he wrote a book on the best games of Akiba Rubinstein. 

After World War II ended, Kmoch and his wife moved to the United States, settling in New York City. Kmoch served as the Secretary and manager of the Manhattan Chess Club, and directed tournaments. He also wrote for Chess Review, then one of the leading American chess magazines.

In 1956, he wrote his most famous book, Pawn Power in Chess (German: Die Kunst der Bauernführung), which is notorious for its use of neologisms ("ram," "lever," "sweeper," "sealer," "quartgrip," "monochromy," etc.).

References

External links 
 

Austrian chess players
Dutch chess players
American chess players
Jewish chess players
Austrian non-fiction writers
Dutch non-fiction writers 
American non-fiction writers 
Chess writers
American chess writers
Chess arbiters
Chess International Masters
Chess Olympiad competitors
Game players from Vienna
Writers from Vienna
American people of Austrian-Jewish descent
Dutch Jews
Dutch emigrants to the United States
1894 births
1973 deaths
Austrian emigrants to the Netherlands